Greenhill is a surname. Notable people with the surname include:

 Alfred George Greenhill (1847–1927), British mathematician
 Basil Greenhill (1920–2003), English diplomat, museum director and historian
 Catherine Greenhill, Australian mathematician
 Craig Greenhill (born 1972), Australian rugby league player
 David Greenhill (born 1985), Scottish footballer
 Denis Greenhill, Baron Greenhill of Harrow (1913–2000), British diplomat
 Elizabeth Greenhill (1615–1679), British mother of 39 children
 Elizabeth Greenhill (bookbinder), (1907–2006), English bookbinder
 Ernest Greenhill, 1st Baron Greenhill (1887–1967), Scottish politician
 Gary Greenhill (born 1985), Scottish footballer
 Sir George Greenhill (1847–1927), English mathematician
 Henry Greenhill (1646–1708), British mariner and politician
 Joe R. Greenhill (1914–2011), American attorney, chief justice of the Texas Supreme Court
 John Greenhill (–1676), English portrait painter
 John Russell Greenhill (–1813), English clergyman, owner of "Chequers"
 Joseph Greenhill (1704–1788), English clergyman and religious disputer
 Kelly M. Greenhill (born 1970), American political scientist
 Robert F. Greenhill (born 1936), American investment banker
 Sir Robert Greenhill-Russell, 1st Baronet (1763–1836), British Member of Parliament, owner of "Chequers"
 Thomas Greenhill (colonial administrator) (1611–1658), English colonial administrator, pioneer of the British East India Company
 Thomas Greenhill (surgeon) (1669–1740), British surgeon and author
 William Greenhill (1591–1671), English nonconformist clergyman and author
 William Alexander Greenhill (1814–1894), English physician, literary editor and sanitary reformer